Pelayo Sánchez Mayo (born 27 March 2000) is a Spanish cyclist, who currently rides for UCI ProTeam .

Major results
2018
 3rd Time trial, National Junior Road Championships
2020
 2nd Overall Vuelta a Cantabria
1st Stage 3
2022
 7th Overall Volta ao Alentejo
1st  Young rider classification
2023
 2nd Trofeo Andratx–Mirador D'es Colomer

Grand Tour general classification results timeline

References

External links

2000 births
Living people
Spanish male cyclists
Cyclists from Asturias